Edward Atterton (born 24 January 1962 in Tamworth, Staffordshire, England) is an English actor and businessman.

Biography
Atterton was born in 1962 to Dr David Valentine Atterton (1927-2002), C.B.E., F.Eng, F.I.M., chairman of Guinness Mahon, director of Barclays Bank and the Bank of England, former Research Fellow in the Department of Metallurgy at Cambridge University and sometime President of the Institute of Metals, and Sheila Atterton, of Cathedral Green House, Wells, Somerset. He attended Rugby School and then Eton College. He read Social Anthropology at Trinity College, Cambridge (B.A. 1984, M.A. 1988). After two years of living in Japan, he returned to the UK and enrolled in the Central School of Speech and Drama.

Atterton's first television role was in an episode of ITV's Agatha Christie's Poirot in 1993. The same year, he was cast in the recurring role of Dr. Alex Taylor in the ITV drama series Medics. After continuing in various British television productions for some years, Atterton began working in the United States.

In 1997, Atterton began dating actress Salma Hayek and moved to Los Angeles to be closer to her. The couple broke up in 2000. He is married to Kelly Atterton, the West Coast editor for Allure magazine. He and Kelly share a daughter, Piper, born December 23, 2004 and son Rex, born October 18, 2008. Atterton has a black belt in karate.

Atterton had a role in the 1998 remake of The Man in the Iron Mask, and also starred in the WB's short-lived spy series Three. Following this, he had appearances in several cult sci-fi/fantasy productions including Alias, Firefly, and Charmed.

In 2003, Atterton played Duncan Idaho in the Sci-Fi Channel's adaptation of Frank Herbert's Children of Dune (2003). His final television appearance to date was in an episode of the Lifetime Channel's drama series Wild Card (2005). Atterton also played the part of a cheese seller in Pie in the Sky. (Series two, Episode 3)

In 2005, Atterton left acting to become the principal manager for the Los Angeles branch of Jigsaw London, the co-founder of which company, John Robinson, is the partner of his sister, Bella Atterton.

Selected filmography

See also
The Mists of Avalon (TV miniseries)
Frank Herbert's Children of Dune
Jigsaw (clothing retailer)

References

External links 
 
 

1962 births
English male film actors
English male television actors
Living people
People from Tamworth, Staffordshire
People educated at Eton College
English male karateka